

Peerage of England

|Duke of Cornwall (1337)||Prince Charles||1630||1649||
|-
|Duke of Buckingham (1623)||George Villiers, 2nd Duke of Buckingham||1628||1687||
|-
|Marquess of Winchester (1551)||John Paulet, 5th Marquess of Winchester||1628||1675||
|-
|Earl of Arundel (1138)||Thomas Howard, 21st Earl of Arundel||1604||1646||
|-
|rowspan="2"|Earl of Oxford (1142)||Robert de Vere, 19th Earl of Oxford||1625||1632||Died
|-
|Aubrey de Vere, 20th Earl of Oxford||1632||1703||
|-
|rowspan="2"|Earl of Shrewsbury (1442)||George Talbot, 9th Earl of Shrewsbury||1617||1630||Died
|-
|John Talbot, 10th Earl of Shrewsbury||1630||1654||
|-
|rowspan="2"|Earl of Kent (1465)||Henry Grey, 8th Earl of Kent||1623||1639||Died
|-
|Anthony Grey, 9th Earl of Kent||1639||1643||
|-
|Earl of Derby (1485)||William Stanley, 6th Earl of Derby||1594||1642||
|-
|Earl of Worcester (1514)||Henry Somerset, 5th Earl of Worcester||1628||1646||
|-
|Earl of Cumberland (1525)||Francis Clifford, 4th Earl of Cumberland||1605||1641||
|-
|rowspan="2"|Earl of Rutland (1525)||Francis Manners, 6th Earl of Rutland||1612||1632||Died
|-
|George Manners, 7th Earl of Rutland||1632||1641||
|-
|Earl of Huntington (1529)||Henry Hastings, 5th Earl of Huntingdon||1604||1643||
|-
|Earl of Sussex (1529)||Edward Radclyffe, 6th Earl of Sussex||1629||1643||
|-
|rowspan="2"|Earl of Bath (1536)||Edward Bourchier, 4th Earl of Bath||1623||1636||Died
|-
|Henry Bourchier, 5th Earl of Bath||1636||1654||
|-
|Earl of Southampton (1547)||Thomas Wriothesley, 4th Earl of Southampton||1624||1667||
|-
|Earl of Bedford (1550)||Francis Russell, 4th Earl of Bedford||1627||1641||
|-
|rowspan="2"|Earl of Pembroke (1551)||William Herbert, 3rd Earl of Pembroke||1601||1630||Died
|-
|Philip Herbert, 4th Earl of Pembroke||1630||1649||
|-
|rowspan="3"|Earl of Devon (1553)||William Courtenay, de jure 3rd Earl of Devon||1557||1630||Died
|-
|Francis Courtenay, de jure 4th Earl of Devon||1630||1638||Died
|-
|William Courtenay, de jure 5th Earl of Devon||1638||1702||
|-
|rowspan="2"|Earl of Northumberland (1557)||Henry Percy, 9th Earl of Northumberland||1585||1632||Died
|-
|Algernon Percy, 10th Earl of Northumberland||1632||1668||
|-
|Earl of Hertford (1559)||William Seymour, 2nd Earl of Herford||1621||1660||
|-
|Earl of Essex (1572)||Robert Devereux, 3rd Earl of Essex||1604||1646||
|-
|Earl of Lincoln (1572)||Theophilus Clinton, 4th Earl of Lincoln||1619||1667||
|-
|Earl of Nottingham (1596)||Charles Howard, 2nd Earl of Nottingham||1624||1642||
|-
|Earl of Suffolk (1603)||Theophilus Howard, 2nd Earl of Suffolk||1626||1640||
|-
|Earl of Dorset (1604)||Edward Sackville, 4th Earl of Dorset||1624||1652||
|-
|Earl of Exeter (1605)||William Cecil, 2nd Earl of Exeter||1623||1640||
|-
|Earl of Montgomery (1605)||Philip Herbert, 1st Earl of Montgomery||1605||1649||Succeeded to the more senior Earldom of Pembroke, see above
|-
|Earl of Salisbury (1605)||William Cecil, 2nd Earl of Salisbury||1612||1668||
|-
|Earl of Somerset (1613)||Robert Carr, 1st Earl of Somerset||1613||1645||
|-
|Earl of Bridgewater (1617)||John Egerton, 1st Earl of Bridgewater||1617||1649||
|-
|Countess of Buckingham (1618)||Mary Villiers, Countess of Buckingham||1618||1632||Died, title extinct
|-
|rowspan="2"|Earl of Northampton (1618)||William Compton, 1st Earl of Northampton||1618||1630||Died
|-
|Spencer Compton, 2nd Earl of Northampton||1630||1643||
|-
|Earl of Leicester (1618)||Robert Sidney, 2nd Earl of Leicester||1626||1677||
|-
|Earl of Warwick (1618)||Robert Rich, 2nd Earl of Warwick||1618||1658||
|-
|Earl of Devonshire (1618)||William Cavendish, 3rd Earl of Devonshire||1628||1684||
|-
|Earl of March (1619)||James Stewart, 2nd Earl of March||1624||1655||Duke of Lennox in the Peerage of Scotland
|-
|Earl of Cambridge (1619)||James Hamilton, 2nd Earl of Cambridge||1625||1649||Marquess of Hamilton in the Peerage of Scotland
|-
|rowspan="2"|Earl of Carlisle (1622)||James Hay, 1st Earl of Carlisle||1622||1636||Died
|-
|James Hay, 2nd Earl of Carlisle||1636||1660||Died
|-
|Earl of Denbigh (1622)||William Feilding, 1st Earl of Denbigh||1622||1643||
|-
|Earl of Bristol (1622)||John Digby, 1st Earl of Bristol||1622||1653||
|-
|Earl of Middlesex (1622)||Lionel Cranfield, 1st Earl of Middlesex||1622||1645||
|-
|rowspan="2"|Earl of Anglesey (1623)||Christopher Villiers, 1st Earl of Anglesey||1623||1630||Died
|-
|Charles Villiers, 2nd Earl of Anglesey||1630||1661||
|-
|Earl of Holland (1624)||Henry Rich, 1st Earl of Holland||1624||1649||
|-
|rowspan="2"|Earl of Clare (1624)||John Holles, 1st Earl of Clare||1624||1637||
|-
|John Holles, 2nd Earl of Clare||1637||1666||
|-
|Earl of Bolingbroke (1624)||Oliver St John, 1st Earl of Bolingbroke||1624||1646||
|-
|Earl of Westmorland (1624)||Mildmay Fane, 2nd Earl of Westmorland||1629||1666||
|-
|Earl of Cleveland (1626)||Thomas Wentworth, 1st Earl of Cleveland||1626||1667||
|-
|Earl of Danby (1626)||Henry Danvers, 1st Earl of Danby||1626||1644||
|-
|Earl of Manchester (1626)||Henry Montagu, 1st Earl of Manchester||1626||1642||
|-
|rowspan="2"|Earl of Marlborough (1626)||Henry Ley, 2nd Earl of Marlborough||1629||1638||Died
|-
|James Ley, 3rd Earl of Marlborough||1638||1665||
|-
|Earl of Mulgrave (1626)||Edmund Sheffield, 1st Earl of Mulgrave||1626||1646||
|-
|Earl of Berkshire (1626)||Thomas Howard, 1st Earl of Berkshire||1626||1669||
|-
|rowspan="2"|Earl of Monmouth (1626)||Robert Carey, 1st Earl of Monmouth||1626||1639||Died
|-
|Henry Carey, 2nd Earl of Monmouth||1639||1661||
|-
|Earl of Banbury (1626)||William Knollys, 1st Earl of Banbury||1626||1632||Died, title extinct
|-
|Earl of Norwich (1626)||Edward Denny, 1st Earl of Norwich||1626||1637||Died, title extinct
|-
|Earl Rivers (1626)||Thomas Darcy, 1st Earl Rivers||1626||1640||
|-
|Earl of Lindsey (1626)||Robert Bertie, 1st Earl of Lindsey||1626||1642||
|-
|Earl of Sunderland (1627)||Emanuel Scrope, 1st Earl of Sunderland||1627||1630||Died, title extinct
|-
|Earl of Newcastle-upon-Tyne (1628)||William Cavendish, 1st Earl of Newcastle-upon-Tyne||1628||1676||
|-
|Earl of Dover (1628)||Henry Carey, 1st Earl of Dover||1628||1666||
|-
|Earl of Peterborough (1628)||John Mordaunt, 1st Earl of Peterborough||1628||1643||
|-
|Earl of Stamford (1628)||Henry Grey, 1st Earl of Stamford||1628||1673||
|-
|rowspan="3"|Earl of Winchilsea (1628)||Elizabeth Finch, 1st Countess of Winchilsea||1628||1634||Died
|-
|Thomas Finch, 2nd Earl of Winchilsea||1634||1639||Died
|-
|Heneage Finch, 3rd Earl of Winchilsea||1639||1689||
|-
|Earl of Kingston-upon-Hull (1628)||Robert Pierrepont, 1st Earl of Kingston-upon-Hull||1628||1643||
|-
|Earl of Carnarvon (1628)||Robert Dormer, 1st Earl of Carnarvon||1628||1643||
|-
|Earl of Newport (1628)||Mountjoy Blount, 1st Earl of Newport||1628||1666||
|-
|Earl of Chesterfield (1628)||Philip Stanhope, 1st Earl of Chesterfield||1628||1656||
|-
|rowspan="2"|Earl of Thanet (1628)||Nicholas Tufton, 1st Earl of Thanet||1628||1632||Died
|-
|John Tufton, 2nd Earl of Thanet||1632||1664||
|-
|rowspan="2"|Earl of St Albans (1628)||Richard Burke, 1st Earl of St Albans||1628||1635||Died
|-
|Ulick Burke, 2nd Earl of St Albans||1635||1657||Earl of Clanricarde in the Peerage of Ireland
|-
|rowspan="2"|Earl of Portland (1633)||Richard Weston, 1st Earl of Portland||1633||1635||New creation; died
|-
|Jerome Weston, 2nd Earl of Portland||1635||1663||
|-
|Viscount Montagu (1554)||Francis Browne, 3rd Viscount Montagu||1629||1682||
|-
|Viscount Purbeck (1618)||John Villiers, 1st Viscount Purbeck||1619||1657||
|-
|Viscount Saye and Sele (1624)||William Fiennes, 1st Viscount Saye and Sele||1624||1662||
|-
|Viscount Wimbledon (1625)||Edward Cecil, 1st Viscount Wimbledon||1625||1638||Died, title extinct
|-
|rowspan="2"|Viscount Savage (1626)||Thomas Savage, 1st Viscount Savage||1626||1635||
|-
|John Savage, 2nd Earl Rivers||1635||1654||
|-
|rowspan="2"|Viscount Conway (1627)||Edward Conway, 1st Viscount Conway||1627||1631||Died
|-
|Edward Conway, 2nd Viscount Conway||1631||1655||
|-
|Viscount Bayning (1628)||Paul Bayning, 2nd Viscount Bayning||1629||1638||Died, title extinct
|-
|Viscount Campden (1628)||Edward Noel, 2nd Viscount Campden||1629||1643||
|-
|Viscount Dorchester (1628)||Dudley Carleton, 1st Viscount Dorchester||1628||1632||Died, title extinct
|-
|Viscount Wentworth (1628)||Thomas Wentworth, 1st Viscount Wentworth||1628||1641||
|-
|Baron de Ros (1264)||Katherine Manners, 19th Baroness de Ros||1632||1649||Title previously held by the Earl of Rutland
|-
|Baron de Clifford (1299)||Anne Clifford, 14th Baroness de Clifford||1605||1676||
|- 
|Baron Morley (1299)||Henry Parker, 14th Baron Morley||1622||1655||
|- 
|rowspan="2"|Baron Dacre (1321)||Richard Lennard, 13th Baron Dacre||1616||1630||Died
|- 
|Francis Lennard, 14th Baron Dacre||1630||1662||
|- 
|Baron Grey of Ruthyn (1325)||Charles Longueville, 12th Baron Grey de Ruthyn||1639||1643||Title previously held by the Earls of Kent
|- 
|Baron Berkeley (1421)||George Berkeley, 8th Baron Berkeley||1613||1658||
|- 
|Baron Dudley (1440)||Edward Sutton, 5th Baron Dudley||1586||1643||
|- 
|rowspan="2"|Baron Stourton (1448)||Edward Stourton, 10th Baron Stourton||1588||1633||Died
|- 
|William Stourton, 11th Baron Stourton||1633||1672||
|- 
|rowspan="2"|Baron Willoughby de Broke (1491)||Margaret Greville, 6th Baroness Willoughby de Broke||1628||1631||Died
|- 
|Greville Verney, 7th Baron Willoughby de Broke||1631||1642||
|- 
|Baron Monteagle (1514)||Henry Parker, 5th Baron Monteagle||1622||1655||
|-
|Baron Vaux of Harrowden (1523)||Edward Vaux, 4th Baron Vaux of Harrowden||1595||1661||
|-
|Baron Sandys of the Vine (1529)||Elizabeth Sandys, 5th Baroness Sandys||1629||1645||
|-
|Baron Windsor (1529)||Thomas Windsor, 6th Baron Windsor||1605||1642||
|-
|Baron Eure (1544)||William Eure, 4th Baron Eure||1617||1646||
|-
|Baron Wharton (1545)||Philip Wharton, 4th Baron Wharton||1625||1695||
|-
|Baron Willoughby of Parham (1547)||Francis Willoughby, 5th Baron Willoughby of Parham||1618||1666||
|-
|Baron Darcy of Aston (1548)||John Darcy, 3rd Baron Darcy of Aston||1602||1635||Died, title extinct
|-
|Baron Paget (1552)||William Paget, 5th Baron Paget||1629||1678||
|-
|Baron North (1554)||Dudley North, 3rd Baron North||1600||1666||
|-
|Baron Chandos (1554)||George Brydges, 6th Baron Chandos||1621||1655||
|-
|Baron De La Warr (1570)||Charles West, 5th Baron De La Warr||1628||1687||
|-
|Baron Norreys (1572)||Elizabeth Wray, 3rd Baroness Norreys||1622||1645||
|-
|Baron (A)bergavenny (1604)||Henry Nevill, 2nd Baron Bergavenny||1622||1641||
|-
|Baron Gerard (1603)||Dutton Gerard, 3rd Baron Gerard||1622||1640||
|-
|rowspan="3"|Baron Petre (1603)||William Petre, 2nd Baron Petre||1613||1637||Died
|-
|Robert Petre, 3rd Baron Petre||1637||1638||
|-
|William Petre, 4th Baron Petre||1638||1684||
|-
|rowspan="2"|Baron Spencer (1603)||William Spencer, 2nd Baron Spencer of Wormleighton||1627||1636||Died
|-
|Henry Spencer, 3rd Baron Spencer of Wormleighton||1636||1643||
|-
|Baron Wotton (1603)||Thomas Wotton, 2nd Baron Wotton||1628||1630||Died, title extinct
|-
|rowspan="2"|Baron Arundell of Wardour (1605)||Thomas Arundell, 1st Baron Arundell of Wardour||1605||1639||Died
|-
|Thomas Arundell, 2nd Baron Arundell of Wardour||1639||1643||
|-
|Baron Stanhope of Harrington (1605)||Charles Stanhope, 2nd Baron Stanhope||1621||1675||
|-
|Baron Clifton (1608)||Katherine Clifton, 2nd Baroness Clifton||1618||1637||Died, title succeeded by the Duke of Lennox
|-
|Baron Teynham (1616)||John Roper, 3rd Baron Teynham||1628||1673||
|-
|Baron Brooke (1621)||Robert Greville, 2nd Baron Brooke||1628||1643||
|-
|Baron Montagu of Boughton (1621)||Edward Montagu, 1st Baron Montagu of Boughton||1621||1644||
|-
|Baron Grey of Warke (1624)||William Grey, 1st Baron Grey of Werke||1624||1674||
|-
|Baron Deincourt (1624)||Francis Leke, 1st Baron Deincourt||1624||1655||
|-
|rowspan="2"|Baron Robartes (1625)||Richard Robartes, 1st Baron Robartes||1625||1634||Died
|-
|John Robartes, 2nd Baron Robartes||1625||1685||
|-
|Baron Craven (1627)||Willian Craven, 1st Baron Craven||1627||1697||
|-
|Baron Fauconberg (1627)||Thomas Belasyse, 1st Baron Fauconberg||1627||1653||
|-
|rowspan="2"|Baron Lovelace (1627)||Richard Lovelace, 1st Baron Lovelace||1627||1634||Died
|-
|John Lovelace, 2nd Baron Lovelace||1634||1670||
|-
|Baron Poulett (1627)||John Poulett, 1st Baron Poulett||1627||1649||
|-
|Baron Clifford (1628)||Henry Clifford, 1st Baron Clifford||1628||1643||
|-
|Baron Brudenell (1628)||Thomas Brudenell, 1st Baron Brudenell||1628||1663||
|-
|Baron Hervey (1628)||William Hervey, 1st Baron Hervey||1628||1642||
|-
|Baron Strange (1628)||James Stanley, 1st Baron Strange||1628||1651||
|-
|Baron Maynard (1628)||William Maynard, 1st Baron Maynard||1628||1640||
|-
|Baron Coventry (1628)||Thomas Coventry, 1st Baron Coventry||1628||1640||
|-
|Baron Weston (1628)||Richard Weston, 1st Baron Weston||1628||1635||Created Earl of Portland, see above
|-
|Baron Goring (1628)||George Goring, 1st Baron Goring||1628||1644||
|-
|Baron Mohun of Okehampton (1628)||John Mohun, 1st Baron Mohun of Okehampton||1628||1640||
|-
|Baron Savile (1628)||John Savile, 1st Baron Savile of Pontefract||1628||1630||Died, Barony succeeded by the Viscount Savile
|-
|rowspan="2"|Baron Boteler of Brantfield (1628)||John Boteler, 1st Baron Boteler of Brantfield||1628||1637||Died
|-
|William Boteler, 2nd Baron Boteler of Brantfield||1637||1657||
|-
|Baron Dunsmore (1628)||Francis Leigh, 1st Baron Dunsmore||1628||1653||
|-
|Baron Powis (1629)||William Herbert, 1st Baron Powis||1629||1655||
|-
|Baron Herbert of Chirbury (1629)||Edward Herbert, 1st Baron Herbert of Cherbury||1629||1648||
|-
|Baron Cottington (1631)||Francis Cottington, 1st Baron Cottington||1631||1652||New creation
|-
|}

Peerage of Scotland

|Duke of Rothesay (1398)||Charles Stuart, Duke of Rothesay||1630||1649||
|-
|Duke of Lennox (1581)||James Stewart, 4th Duke of Lennox||1624||1655||
|-
|rowspan=2|Marquess of Huntly (1599)||George Gordon, 1st Marquess of Huntly||1599||1636||Died
|-
|George Gordon, 2nd Marquess of Huntly||1636||1649||
|-
|Marquess of Hamilton (1599)||James Hamilton, 3rd Marquess of Hamilton||1625||1649||
|-
|Marquess of Douglas (1633)||William Douglas, 1st Marquess of Douglas||1633||1660||
|-
|Earl of Angus (1389)||William Douglas, 11th Earl of Angus||1611||1660||Created Marquess of Douglas, see above
|-
|rowspan=2|Earl of Argyll (1457)||Archibald Campbell, 7th Earl of Argyll||1584||1638||Died
|-
|Archibald Campbell, 8th Earl of Argyll||1638||1661||
|-
|rowspan=3|Earl of Crawford (1398)||George Lindsay, 14th Earl of Crawford||1622||1633||Died
|-
|Alexander Lindsay, 15th Earl of Crawford||1633||1639||Died
|-
|Ludovic Lindsay, 16th Earl of Crawford||1639||1652||
|-
|rowspan=3|Earl of Erroll (1452)||Francis Hay, 9th Earl of Erroll||1585||1631||Died
|-
|William Hay, 10th Earl of Erroll||1631||1636||Died
|-
|Gilbert Hay, 11th Earl of Erroll||1636||1674||
|-
|rowspan=2|Earl Marischal (1458)||William Keith, 6th Earl Marischal||1623||1635||Died
|-
|William Keith, 7th Earl Marischal||1635||1671||
|-
|Earl of Sutherland (1235)||John Gordon, 14th Earl of Sutherland||1615||1679||
|-
|rowspan=2|Earl of Mar (1114)||John Erskine, 19th/2nd Earl of Mar||1572||1634||Died
|-
|John Erskine, 19th Earl of Mar||1634||1654||
|-
|Earl of Rothes (1458)||John Leslie, 6th Earl of Rothes||1611||1641||
|-
|Earl of Morton (1458)||William Douglas, 7th Earl of Morton||1606||1648||
|-
|Earl of Menteith (1427)||William Graham, 7th Earl of Menteith||1598||1661||
|-
|rowspan=3|Earl of Glencairn (1488)||James Cunningham, 7th Earl of Glencairn||1578||1630||Died
|-
|William Cunningham, 8th Earl of Glencairn||1630||1631||Died
|-
|William Cunningham, 9th Earl of Glencairn||1631||1634||
|-
|Earl of Eglinton (1507)||Alexander Montgomerie, 6th Earl of Eglinton||1612||1661||
|-
|Earl of Montrose (1503)||James Graham, 5th Earl of Montrose||1626||1650||
|-
|Earl of Cassilis (1509)||John Kennedy, 6th Earl of Cassilis||1615||1668||
|-
|Earl of Caithness (1455)||George Sinclair, 5th Earl of Caithness||1582||1643||
|-
|Earl of Buchan (1469)||James Erskine, 7th Earl of Buchan||1628||1664||
|-
|rowspan=2|Earl of Moray (1562)||James Stuart, 3rd Earl of Moray||1591||1638||Died
|-
|James Stewart, 4th Earl of Moray||1638||1653||
|-
|Earl of Linlithgow (1600)||Alexander Livingston, 2nd Earl of Linlithgow||1621||1650||
|-
|Earl of Winton (1600)||George Seton, 3rd Earl of Winton||1607||1650||
|-
|rowspan=2|Earl of Home (1605)||James Home, 2nd Earl of Home||1619||1633||Died
|-
|James Home, 3rd Earl of Home||1633||1666||
|-
|Earl of Perth (1605)||John Drummond, 2nd Earl of Perth||1611||1662||
|-
|Earl of Dunfermline (1605)||Charles Seton, 2nd Earl of Dunfermline||1622||1672||
|-
|Earl of Wigtown (1606)||John Fleming, 2nd Earl of Wigtown||1619||1650||
|-
|Earl of Abercorn (1606)||James Hamilton, 2nd Earl of Abercorn||1618||1670||
|-
|Earl of Kinghorne (1606)||John Lyon, 2nd Earl of Kinghorne||1615||1646||
|-
|Earl of Roxburghe (1616)||Robert Ker, 1st Earl of Roxburghe||1616||1650||
|-
|rowspan=2|Earl of Kellie (1619)||Thomas Erskine, 1st Earl of Kellie||1619||1639||Died
|-
|Thomas Erskine, 2nd Earl of Kellie||1639||1643||
|-
|rowspan=2|Earl of Buccleuch (1619)||Walter Scott, 1st Earl of Buccleuch||1619||1633||Died
|-
|Francis Scott, 2nd Earl of Buccleuch||1633||1651||
|-
|rowspan=2|Earl of Haddington (1619)||Thomas Hamilton, 1st Earl of Haddington||1619||1637||Died
|-
|Thomas Hamilton, 2nd Earl of Haddington||1637||1640||
|-
|Earl of Nithsdale (1620)||Robert Maxwell, 1st Earl of Nithsdale||1620||1646||
|-
|Earl of Galloway (1623)||Alexander Stewart, 1st Earl of Galloway||1623||1649||
|-
|rowspan=2|Earl of Seaforth (1623)||Colin Mackenzie, 1st Earl of Seaforth||1623||1633||Died
|-
|George Mackenzie, 2nd Earl of Seaforth||1633||1651||
|-
|Earl of Lauderdale (1624)||John Maitland, 1st Earl of Lauderdale||1624||1645||
|-
|Earl of Annandale (1625)||John Murray, 1st Earl of Annandale||1625||1640||
|-
|Earl of Tullibardine (1628)||Patrick Murray, 1st Earl of Tullibardine||1628||1644||
|-
|Earl of Carrick (1628)||John Stewart, 1st Earl of Carrick||1628||1646||
|-
|Earl of Atholl (1629)||John Murray, 1st Earl of Atholl||1629||1642||
|-
|Earl of Lothian (1631)||William Kerr, 1st Earl of Lothian||1631||1675||New creation
|-
|Earl of Airth (1633)||William Graham, 1st Earl of Airth||1633||1661||New creation
|-
|Earl of Lindsay (1633)||John Lindsay, 1st Earl of Lindsay||1633||1678||New creation
|-
|Earl of Loudoun (1633)||John Campbell, 1st Earl of Loudoun||1633||1662||New creation
|-
|rowspan=2|Earl of Kinnoull (1633)||George Hay, 1st Earl of Kinnoull||1633||1642||New creation; died
|-
|George Hay, 2nd Earl of Kinnoull||1634||1644||
|-
|Earl of Dumfries (1633)||William Crichton, 1st Earl of Dumfries||1633||1643||New creation
|-
|Earl of Queensberry (1633)||William Douglas, 1st Earl of Queensberry||1633||1640||New creation
|-
|Earl of Stirling (1633)||William Alexander, 1st Earl of Stirling||1633||1640||New creation; also created Viscount of Stirling in 1630
|-
|Earl of Elgin (1633)||Thomas Bruce, 1st Earl of Elgin||1633||1663||New creation
|-
|Earl of Southesk (1633)||David Carnegie, 1st Earl of Southesk||1633||1658||New creation
|-
|Earl of Traquair (1633)||John Stewart, 1st Earl of Traquair||1633||1659||New creation
|-
|Earl of Ancram (1633)||Robert Kerr, 1st Earl of Ancram||1633||1654||New creation
|-
|Earl of Wemyss (1633)||John Wemyss, 1st Earl of Wemyss||1633||1649||New creation
|-
|Earl of Dalhousie (1633)||William Ramsay, 1st Earl of Dalhousie||1633||1672||New creation
|-
|Earl of Findlater (1638)||James Ogilvy, 1st Earl of Findlater||1638||1653||New creation
|-
|Earl of Lanark (1639)||William Hamilton, 1st Earl of Lanark||1639||1651||New creation
|-
|Earl of Airlie (1639)||James Ogilvy, 1st Earl of Airlie||1639||1665||New creation
|-
|Earl of Carnwath (1639)||Robert Dalzell, 1st Earl of Carnwath||1639||1654||New creation
|-
|rowspan=2|Viscount of Falkland (1620)||Henry Cary, 1st Viscount of Falkland||1620||1633||Died
|-
|Lucius Cary, 2nd Viscount of Falkland||1633||1643||
|-
|Viscount of Dunbar (1620)||Henry Constable, 1st Viscount of Dunbar||1620||1645||
|-
|rowspan=2|Viscount of Stormont (1621)||David Murray, 1st Viscount of Stormont||1621||1631||Died
|-
|Mungo Murray, 2nd Viscount of Stormont||1631||1642||
|-
|Viscount of Ayr (1622)||William Crichton, 1st Viscount of Ayr||1622||1643||Created Earl of Dumfries, see above
|-
|Viscount of Dupplin (1627)||George Hay, 1st Viscount of Dupplin||1627||1634||Created Earl of Kinnoull, see above
|-
|Viscount of Melgum (1627)||John Gordon, 1st Viscount of Melgum||1627||1630||Died, title extinct
|-
|Viscount of Drumlanrig (1628)||William Douglas, 1st Viscount of Drumlanrig||1628||1640||Created Earl of Queensberry, see above
|-
|rowspan=2|Viscount of Aboyne (1632)||George Gordon, 1st Viscount of Aboyne||1632||1636||On Lord Huntly's succession to the marquessate in 1636 the viscountcy passed according to the special remainder to his second son
|-
|James Gordon, 2nd Viscount Aboyne||1636||1649||
|-
|Viscount of Belhaven (1633)||Robert Douglas, 1st Viscount of Belhaven||1633||1639||New creation; died, title extinct
|-
|rowspan=3|Viscount of Kenmure (1633)||John Gordon, 1st Viscount of Kenmure||1633||1634||New creation; died
|-
|John Gordon, 2nd Viscount of Kenmure||1634||1639||Died
|-
|John Gordon, 3rd Viscount of Kenmure||1639||1643||
|-
|Lord Somerville (1430)||Hugh Somerville, 9th Lord Somerville||1618||1640||
|-
|Lord Forbes (1442)||Arthur Forbes, 9th Lord Forbes||1606||1641||
|-
|Lord Lindsay of the Byres (1445)||John Lindsay, 10th Lord Lindsay||1619||1678||Created Earl of Lindsay, see above
|-
|Lord Saltoun (1445)||Alexander Abernethy, 9th Lord Saltoun||1612||1668||
|-
|Lord Gray (1445)||Andrew Gray, 7th Lord Gray||1611||1663||
|-
|Lord Sinclair (1449)||John Sinclair, 9th Lord Sinclair||1615||1676||
|-
|Lord Borthwick (1452)||John Borthwick, 9th Lord Borthwick||1623||1675||
|-
|Lord Boyd (1454)||Robert Boyd, 8th Lord Boyd||1628||1640||
|-
|rowspan=2|Lord Oliphant (1455)||Laurence Oliphant, 5th Lord Oliphant||1593||1631||Died
|-
|Patrick Oliphant, 6th Lord Oliphant||1631||1680||
|-
|Lord Cathcart (1460)||Alan Cathcart, 6th Lord Cathcart||1628||1709||
|-
|rowspan=2|Lord Lovat (1464)||Simon Fraser, 6th Lord Lovat||1577||1633||Died
|-
|Hugh Fraser, 7th Lord Lovat||1633||1646||
|-
|Lord Carlyle of Torthorwald (1473)||James Douglas, 6th Lord Carlyle||1605||1638||Surrendered the lordship
|-
|Lord Hay of Yester (1488)||John Hay, 8th Lord Hay of Yester||1609||1653||
|-
|rowspan=2|Lord Sempill (1489)||Hugh Sempill, 5th Lord Sempill||1611||1639||Died
|-
|Francis Sempill, 6th Lord Sempill||1639||1644||
|-
|rowspan=2|Lord Herries of Terregles (1490)||John Maxwell, 6th Lord Herries of Terregles||1604||1631||Died
|-
|John Maxwell, 7th Lord Herries of Terregles||1631||1677||
|-
|Lord Ogilvy of Airlie (1491)||James Ogilvy, 7th Lord Ogilvy of Airlie||1617||1665||Created Earl of Airlie, see above
|-
|rowspan=3|Lord Ross (1499)||James Ross, 6th Lord Ross||1595||1633||Died
|-
|James Ross, 7th Lord Ross||1633||1636||Died
|-
|William Ross, 8th Lord Ross||1636||1640||
|-
|rowspan=2|Lord Elphinstone (1509)||Alexander Elphinstone, 4th Lord Elphinstone||1602||1638||Died
|-
|Alexander Elphinstone, 5th Lord Elphinstone||1638||1648||
|-
|Lord Ochiltree (1543)||James Stewart, 4th Lord Ochiltree||1615||1658||
|-
|rowspan=2|Lord Torphichen (1564)||John Sandilands, 4th Lord Torphichen||1622||1637||Died
|-
|John Sandilands, 5th Lord Torphichen||1637||1649||
|-
|Lord Spynie (1590)||Alexander Lindsay, 2nd Lord Spynie||1607||1646||
|-
|Lord Lindores (1600)||Patrick Leslie, 2nd Lord Lindores||1608||1649||
|-
|Lord Campbell of Loudoun (1601)||John Campbell, 2nd Lord Campbell of Loudoun||1619||1662||Created Earl of Loudoun, see above
|-
|Lord Kinloss (1602)||Thomas Bruce, 3rd Lord Kinloss||1613||1663||Created Earl of Elgin, see above
|-
|Lord Colville of Culross (1604)||James Colville, 2nd Lord Colville of Culross||1629||1654||
|-
|Lord Balmerinoch (1606)||John Elphinstone, 2nd Lord Balmerino||1612||1649||
|-
|rowspan=2|Lord Blantyre (1606)||William Stewart, 2nd Lord Blantyre||1617||1638||Died
|-
|Walter Stewart, 3rd Lord Blantyre||1638||1641||
|-
|Lord Coupar (1607)||James Elphinstone, 1st Lord Coupar||1607||1669||
|-
|Lord Holyroodhouse (1607)||John Bothwell, 2nd Lord Holyroodhouse||1609||1638||Died, title dormant
|-
|Lord Balfour of Burleigh (1607)||Robert Balfour, 2nd Lord Balfour of Burleigh||1619||1663||
|-
|Lord Cranstoun (1609)||John Cranstoun, 2nd Lord Cranstoun||1627||1648||
|-
|Lord Maderty (1609)||John Drummond, 2nd Lord Madderty||1623||1647||
|-
|Lord Dingwall (1609)||Elizabeth Preston, 2nd Lady Dingwall||1628||1684||
|-
|Lord Cardross (1610)||David Erskine, 2nd Lord Cardross||1634||1671||Title previously held by the Earl of Buchan
|-
|Lord Ogilvy of Deskford (1616)||James Ogilvy, 2nd Lord Ogilvy of Deskford||1626||1653||Created Earl of Findlater, see above
|-
|Lord Carnegie (1616)||David Carnegie, 1st Lord Carnegie||1616||1658||Created Earl of Southesk, see above
|-
|rowspan=2|Lord Melville of Monymaill (1616)||Robert Melville, 2nd Lord Melville||1621||1635||Died
|-
|John Melville, 3rd Lord Melville||1635||1643||
|-
|Lord Ramsay of Dalhousie (1618)||William Ramsay, 2nd Lord Ramsay of Dalhousie||Bef 1629||1672||Created Earl of Dalhousie, see above
|-
|Lord Jedburgh (1622)||Andrew Ker, 1st Lord Jedburgh||1622||1633||Died
|-
|Lord Kintyre (1626)||James Campbell, 1st Lord Kintyre||1626||1645||
|-
|rowspan=2|Lord Aston of Forfar (1627)||Walter Aston, 1st Lord Aston of Forfar||1627||1639||Died
|-
|Walter Aston, 2nd Lord Aston of Forfar||1639||1678||
|-
|Lord Barrett (1627)||Edward Barrett, 1st Lord Barrett of Newburgh||1627||1645||
|-
|Lord Fairfax of Cameron (1627)||Thomas Fairfax, 1st Lord Fairfax of Cameron||1627||1640||
|-
|Lord Napier (1627)||Archibald Napier, 1st Lord Napier||1627||1645||
|-
|Lord Reay (1628)||Donald Mackay, 1st Lord Reay||1628||1649||
|-
|Lord Cramond (1628)||Elizabeth Richardson, 1st Lady Cramond||1628||1651||
|-
|Lord Wemyss of Elcho (1628)||John Wemyss, 1st Lord Wemyss of Elcho||1628||1649||Created Earl of Wemyss, see above
|-
|Lord Lindsay of Balcarres (1633)||David Lindsay, 1st Lord Balcarres||1633||1641||New creation
|-
|Lord Livingston of Almond (1633)||James Livingston, 1st Lord Livingston of Almond||1633||1674||New creation
|-
|rowspan=2|Lord Forbes of Pitsligo (1633)||Alexander Forbes, 1st Lord Forbes of Pitsligo||1633||1636||New creation; died
|-
|Alexander Forbes, 2nd Lord Forbes of Pitsligo||1636||1690||
|-
|Lord Kirkcudbright (1633)||Robert Maclellan, 1st Lord Kirkcudbright||1633||1641||New creation
|-
|rowspan=2|Lord Fraser (1633)||Andrew Fraser, 1st Lord Fraser||1633||1636||New creation; died
|-
|Andrew Fraser, 2nd Lord Fraser||1636||1674||
|-
|Lord Forrester (1633)||George Forrester, 1st Lord Forrester||1633||1654||New creation
|-
|Lord Innerwick (1638)||James Maxwell, 1st Lord Innerwick||1638||1650||New creation
|-
|Lord Rosehill and Inglismaldie (1639)||John Carnegie, 1st Lord Rosehill and Inglismaldie||1639||1667||New creation
|-
|Lord Ruthven of Ettrick (1639)||Patrick Ruthven, 1st Lord Ruthven of Ettrick||1639||1651||New creation
|-
|}

Peerage of Ireland

|Earl of Kildare (1316)||George FitzGerald, 16th Earl of Kildare||1620||1660||
|-
|rowspan=2|Earl of Ormond (1328)||Walter Butler, 11th Earl of Ormond||1614||1633||Died
|-
|James Butler, 12th Earl of Ormonde||1633||1688||
|-
|rowspan=2|Earl of Waterford (1446)||George Talbot, 9th Earl of Waterford||1617||1630||Died
|-
|John Talbot, 10th Earl of Waterford||1630||1654||
|-
|rowspan=2|Earl of Clanricarde (1543)||Richard Burke, 4th Earl of Clanricarde||1601||1635||Died
|-
|Ulick Burke, 5th Earl of Clanricarde||1635||1657||
|-
|rowspan=2|Earl of Thomond (1543)||Henry O'Brien, 5th Earl of Thomond||1624||1639||Died
|-
|Barnabas O'Brien, 6th Earl of Thomond||1639||1657||
|-
|rowspan=2|Earl of Castlehaven (1616)||Mervyn Tuchet, 2nd Earl of Castlehaven||1617||1630||Died
|-
|James Tuchet, 3rd Earl of Castlehaven||1630||1684||
|-
|Earl of Cork (1620)||Richard Boyle, 1st Earl of Cork||1620||1643||
|-
|rowspan=2|Earl of Antrim (1620)||Randal MacDonnell, 1st Earl of Antrim||1620||1636||Died
|-
|Randal MacDonnell, 2nd Earl of Antrim||1636||1682||
|-
|Earl of Westmeath (1621)||Richard Nugent, 1st Earl of Westmeath||1621||1642||
|-
|Earl of Roscommon (1622)||James Dillon, 1st Earl of Roscommon||1622||1642||
|-
|rowspan=2|Earl of Londonderry (1622)||Thomas Ridgeway, 1st Earl of Londonderry||1622||1631||Died
|-
|Robert Ridgeway, 2nd Earl of Londonderry||1631||1641||
|-
|Earl of Meath (1627)||William Brabazon, 1st Earl of Meath||1627||1651||
|-
|Earl of Barrymore (1628)||David Barry, 1st Earl of Barrymore||1628||1642||
|-
|rowspan=2|Earl of Carbery (1628)||John Vaughan, 1st Earl of Carbery||1628||1634||Died
|-
|Richard Vaughan, 2nd Earl of Carbery||1634||1687||
|-
|rowspan=2|Earl of Fingall (1628)||Luke Plunkett, 1st Earl of Fingall||1628||1637||Died
|-
|Christopher Plunkett, 2nd Earl of Fingall||1637||1649||
|-
|Earl of Downe (1628)||William Pope, 1st Earl of Downe||1628||1640||
|-
|Earl of Desmond (1628)||George Feilding, 1st Earl of Desmond||1628||1665||
|-
|rowspan=2|Viscount Gormanston (1478)||Jenico Preston, 5th Viscount Gormanston||1599||1630||Died
|-
|Nicholas Preston, 6th Viscount Gormanston||1630||1643||
|-
|Viscount Mountgarret (1550)||Richard Butler, 3rd Viscount Mountgarret||1602||1651||
|-
|Viscount Powerscourt (1618)||Richard Wingfield, 1st Viscount Powerscourt||1618||1634||Died, title extinct
|-
|rowspan=2|Viscount Grandison (1621)||Oliver St John, 1st Viscount Grandison||1621||1630||Died
|-
|William Villiers, 2nd Viscount Grandison||1630||1643||
|-
|Viscount Wilmot (1621)||Charles Wilmot, 1st Viscount Wilmot||1621||1644||
|-
|Viscount Valentia (1621)||Henry Power, 1st Viscount Valentia||1621||1642||
|-
|Viscount Moore (1621)||Charles Moore, 2nd Viscount Moore||1627||1643||
|-
|rowspan=2|Viscount Dillon (1622)||Theobald Dillon, 3rd Viscount Dillon||1629||1630||Died
|-
|Thomas Dillon, 4th Viscount Dillon||1630||1672||
|-
|Viscount Loftus (1622)||Adam Loftus, 1st Viscount Loftus||1622||1643||
|-
|Viscount Beaumont of Swords (1622)||Sapcote Beaumont, 2nd Viscount Beaumont of Swords||1625||1658||
|-
|Viscount Netterville (1622)||Nicholas Netterville, 1st Viscount Netterville||1622||1654||
|-
|rowspan=2|Viscount Montgomery (1622)||Hugh Montgomery, 1st Viscount Montgomery||1622||1636||Died
|-
|Hugh Montgomery, 2nd Viscount Montgomery||1636||1642||
|-
|Viscount Claneboye (1622)||James Hamilton, 1st Viscount Claneboye||1622||1644||
|-
|rowspan=2|Viscount Magennis (1623)||Hugh Magennis, 2nd Viscount Magennis||1629||1639||Died
|-
|Arthur Magennis, 3rd Viscount Magennis||1639||1683||
|-
|Viscount Lecale (1624)||Thomas Cromwell, 1st Viscount Lecale||1624||1653||
|-
|Viscount Chichester (1625)||Edward Chichester, 1st Viscount Chichester||1625||1648||
|-
|rowspan=2|Viscount Kilmorey (1625)||Robert Needham, 1st Viscount Kilmorey||1625||1631||Died
|-
|Robert Needham, 2nd Viscount Kilmorey||1631||1653||
|-
|Viscount Somerset (1626)||Thomas Somerset, 1st Viscount Somerset||1626||1649||
|-
|Viscount Carlingford (1627)||Barnham Swift, 1st Viscount Carlingford||1627||1634||Died, title extinct
|-
|rowspan=2|Viscount Baltinglass (1627)||Thomas Roper, 1st Viscount Baltinglass||1627||1637||Died
|-
|Thomas Roper, 2nd Viscount Baltinglass||1637||1670||
|-
|rowspan=2|Viscount Castleton (1627)||Nicholas Saunderson, 1st Viscount Castleton||1627||1630||Died
|-
|Nicholas Saunderson, 2nd Viscount Castleton||1630||1640||
|-
|rowspan=2|Viscount Killultagh (1627)||Edward Conway, 1st Viscount Killultagh||1627||1631||Died
|-
|Edward Conway, 2nd Viscount Killultagh||1631||1655||
|-
|Viscount Mayo (1627)||Miles Bourke, 2nd Viscount Mayo||1629||1649||
|-
|rowspan=2|Viscount Sarsfield (1627)||Dominick Sarsfield, 1st Viscount Sarsfield||1627||1636||Died
|-
|William Sarsfield, 2nd Viscount Sarsfield||1636||1648||
|-
|Viscount Boyle of Kinalmeaky (1628)||Lewis Boyle, 1st Viscount Boyle of Kinalmeaky||1628||1642||
|-
|rowspan=2|Viscount Chaworth (1628)||George Chaworth, 1st Viscount Chaworth||1628||1639||Died
|-
|John Chaworth, 2nd Viscount Chaworth||1639||1644||
|-
|Viscount Savile (1628)||Thomas Savile, 1st Viscount Savile||1628||1659||
|-
|Viscount Cholmondeley (1628)||Robert Cholmondeley, 1st Viscount Cholmondeley||1628||1659||
|-
|Viscount Lumley (1628)||Richard Lumley, 1st Viscount Lumley||1628||1663||
|-
|Viscount Taaffe (1628)||John Taaffe, 1st Viscount Taaffe||1628||1642||
|-
|rowspan=2|Viscount Molyneux (1628)||Richard Molyneux, 1st Viscount Molyneux||1628||1636||Died
|-
|Richard Molyneux, 2nd Viscount Molyneux||1636||1654||
|-
|Viscount Monson (1628)||William Monson, 1st Viscount Monson||1628||1660||
|-
|Viscount Muskerry (1628)||Charles MacCarthy, 1st Viscount Muskerry||1628||1640||
|-
|rowspan=2|Viscount Strangford (1628)||Thomas Smythe, 1st Viscount Strangford||1628||1635||Died
|-
|Philip Smythe, 2nd Viscount Strangford||1635||1708||
|-
|Viscount Scudamore (1628)||John Scudamore, 1st Viscount Scudamore||1628||1671||
|-
|Viscount Wenman (1628)||Richard Wenman, 1st Viscount Wenman||1628||1640||
|-
|Viscount Ranelagh (1628)||Roger Jones, 1st Viscount Ranelagh||1628||1643||
|-
|rowspan=2|Viscount Bourke of Clanmories (1629)||John Bourke, 1st Viscount Bourke||1629||1635||
|-
|Thomas Bourke, 2nd Viscount Bourke||1635||1650||
|-
|Viscount FitzWilliam (1629)||Thomas FitzWilliam, 1st Viscount FitzWilliam||1629||1650||
|-
|rowspan=2|Viscount Fairfax of Emley (1629)||Thomas Fairfax, 1st Viscount Fairfax of Emley||1629||1636||Died
|-
|Thomas Fairfax, 2nd Viscount Fairfax of Emley||1636||1641||
|-
|Viscount Ikerrin (1629)||Pierce Butler, 1st Viscount Ikerrin||1629||1674||
|-
|rowspan=2|Viscount Clanmalier (1631)||Terence O'Dempsey, 1st Viscount Clanmalier||1631||1638||New creation; died
|-
|Lewis O'Dempsey, 2nd Viscount Clanmalier||1638||1683||
|-
|Baron Athenry (1172)||Richard III de Bermingham||1612||1645||
|-
|Baron Kingsale (1223)||Gerald de Courcy, 19th Baron Kingsale||1628||1642||
|-
|rowspan=2|Baron Kerry (1223)||Thomas Fitzmaurice, 18th Baron Kerry||1600||1630||Died
|-
|Patrick Fitzmaurice, 19th Baron Kerry||1630||1661||
|-
|Baron Slane (1370)||William Fleming, 14th Baron Slane||1629||1641||
|-
|Baron Howth (1425)||Nicholas St Lawrence, 11th Baron Howth||1619||1643||
|-
|rowspan=2|Baron Trimlestown (1461)||Robert Barnewall, 7th Baron Trimlestown||1598||1639||Died
|-
|Matthias Barnewall, 8th Baron Trimlestown||1539||1667||
|-
|Baron Dunsany (1462)||Patrick Plunkett, 9th Baron of Dunsany||1603||1668||
|-
|Baron Power (1535)||John Power, 5th Baron Power||1607||1661||
|-
|Baron Dunboyne (1541)||Edmond Butler, 3rd/13th Baron Dunboyne||1624||1640||
|-
|Baron Louth (1541)||Oliver Plunkett, 6th Baron Louth||1629||1679||
|-
|rowspan=2|Baron Upper Ossory (1541)||Barnaby Fitzpatrick, 5th Baron Upper Ossory||1627||1638||Died
|-
|Barnaby Fitzpatrick, 6th Baron Upper Ossory||1638||1666||
|-
|Baron Inchiquin (1543)||Murrough O'Brien, 6th Baron Inchiquin||1624||1674||
|-
|rowspan=2|Baron Bourke of Castleconnell (1580)||Edmund Bourke, 5th Baron Bourke of Connell||1599||1635||Died
|-
|William Bourke, 6th Baron Bourke of Connell||1635||1665||
|-
|Baron Cahir (1583)||Thomas Butler, 3rd Baron Cahir||1627||1648||
|-
|rowspan=3|Baron Hamilton (1617)||James Hamilton, 2nd Baron Hamilton||1617||1633||Died
|-
|Claud Hamilton, 2nd Baron Hamilton of Strabane||1633||1638||Died
|-
|James Hamilton, 3rd Baron Hamilton of Strabane||1638||1655||
|-
|Baron Bourke of Brittas (1618)||Theobald Bourke, 1st Baron Bourke of Brittas||1618||1654||
|-
|Baron Lambart (1618)||Charles Lambart, 2nd Baron Lambart||1618||1660||
|-
|Baron Mountjoy (1618)||Mountjoy Blount, 1st Baron Mountjoy||1618||1665||
|-
|rowspan=3|Baron Balfour (1619)||James Balfour, 1st Baron Balfour of Glenawley||1619||1634||Died
|-
|James Balfour, 2nd Baron Balfour of Glenawley||1634||1635||Died
|-
|Alexander Balfour, 3rd Baron Balfour of Glenawley||1635||1636||Died, title extinct
|-
|rowspan=2|Baron Castle Stewart (1619)||Andrew Stewart, 2nd Baron Castle Stewart||1629||1639||Died
|-
|Andrew Stewart, 3rd Baron Castle Stewart||1639||1650||
|-
|Baron Folliot (1620)||Thomas Folliott, 2nd Baron Folliott||1622||1697||
|-
|Baron Maynard (1620)||William Maynard, 1st Baron Maynard||1620||1640||
|-
|Baron Gorges of Dundalk (1620)||Edward Gorges, 1st Baron Gorges of Dundalk||1620||1650||
|-
|Baron Offaly (1620)||Lettice Digby, 1st Baroness Offaly||1620||1658||
|-
|Baron Digby (1620)||Robert Digby, 1st Baron Digby||1620||1642||
|-
|Baron Hervey (1620)||William Hervey, 1st Baron Hervey||1620||1642||
|-
|Baron Fitzwilliam (1620)||William Fitzwilliam, 1st Baron Fitzwilliam||1620||1644||
|-
|Baron Caulfeild (1620)||William Caulfeild, 2nd Baron Caulfeild||1627||1640||
|-
|rowspan=2|Baron Aungier (1621)||Francis Aungier, 1st Baron Aungier of Longford||1621||1632||Died
|-
|Gerald Aungier, 2nd Baron Aungier of Longford||1632||1655||
|-
|Baron Blayney (1621)||Henry Blayney, 2nd Baron Blayney||1629||1646||
|-
|rowspan=2|Baron Dockwra (1621)||Henry Dockwra, 1st Baron Dockwra||1621||1631||Died
|-
|Theodore Dockwra, 2nd Baron Dockwra||1631||1647||
|-
|Baron Esmonde (1622)||Laurence Esmonde, 1st Baron Esmonde||1622||1646||
|-
|Baron Glean-O'Mallun (1622)||Dermot O'Mallun, 1st Baron Glean-O'Mallun||1622||1639||Died, title extinct
|-
|rowspan=2|Baron Brereton (1624)||William Brereton, 1st Baron Brereton||1624||1631||Died
|-
|William Brereton, 2nd Baron Brereton||1631||1664||
|-
|Baron Herbert of Castle Island (1624)||Edward Herbert, 1st Baron Herbert of Castle Island||1624||1648||
|-
|rowspan=2|Baron Baltimore (1625)||George Calvert, 1st Baron Baltimore||1625||1632||Died
|-
|Cecilius Calvert, 2nd Baron Baltimore||1632||1675||
|-
|Baron Coleraine (1625)||Hugh Hare, 1st Baron Coleraine||1625||1667||
|-
|Baron Sherard (1627)||William Sherard, 1st Baron Sherard||1627||1640||
|-
|Baron Boyle of Broghill (1628)||Roger Boyle, 1st Baron Boyle of Broghill||1628||1679||
|-
|rowspan=2|Baron Maguire (1628)||Bryan Maguire, 1st Baron Maguire||1628||1633||Died
|-
|Connor Maguire, 2nd Baron Maguire||1633||1645||
|-
|Baron Mountnorris (1629)||Francis Annesley, 1st Baron Mountnorris||1629||1660||
|-
|}

References

 

Lists of peers by decade
1630s in England
1630s in Ireland
17th century in England
17th century in Scotland
17th century in Ireland
Lists of 17th-century English people
17th-century Scottish peers
17th-century Irish people
Peers
Peers